Kepler-19b is a planet orbiting around the star Kepler-19. The planet has an orbital period of 9.3 days, with an estimated radius of roughly 2.2 times that of the Earth, with a mass around 8.4 times that of the Earth. It is one of three planets orbiting Kepler-19.

See also
List of planets discovered by the Kepler spacecraft

References

Exoplanets discovered in 2011
19b